Šulinci (Prekmurje Slovene: Šülinci) is a village in the Municipality of Gornji Petrovci in the Prekmurje region of Slovenia.

The old village school, built in 1913 and closed in 1962, now functions as a village hall.

References

External links
Šulinci on Geopedia

Populated places in the Municipality of Gornji Petrovci